Norman Dewey "Rocky" Holcomb III (born 1968) is an American politician who served as a member of the Virginia House of Delegates for the 85th district from 2017 to 2018. He is a member of the Republican Party.

Career
Holcomb served in the United States Marine Corps and for the Virginia Beach Sheriff's Office. He won a special election to the Virginia House of Delegates held on January 10, 2017, to succeed Scott Taylor, who had been elected to the United States House of Representatives. He went on to lose the November general election in 2017 to Cheryl Turpin, whom he had faced earlier that year in the special election.

During the 2019 election cycle, instead of running for re-election, Cheryl Turpin decided to instead run for Virginia State Senate. The 85th district seat now vulnerable, Holcomb announced he would run for the seat once more. He was challenged by Democrat Alex Askew, who served as a staffer for Barack Obama‘s 2012 presidential campaign. Holcomb lost to Askew by a margin of 3.46% 

On August 12, 2021, Holcomb was appointed to the Virginia Beach City Council after the seat was vacated by Jessica Abbott.

References

1968 births
Living people
21st-century American politicians
Republican Party members of the Virginia House of Delegates
United States Marines
Regent University alumni
Politicians from Virginia Beach, Virginia
People from Bluefield, West Virginia
Candidates in the 2019 United States elections